You Signed Up for This is the debut studio album by British singer-songwriter Maisie Peters, released on 27 August 2021 through Ed Sheeran's Gingerbread Man Records.

Background
Maisie Peters started her music career when she began uploading her own original songs to YouTube in 2015. Before the release of her first studio album, Peters previously released the extended plays Dressed Too Nice for a Jacket (2018) and It's Your Bed Babe, It's Your Funeral (2019) with Atlantic Records UK.

Work on the album began in summer 2020 when Peters went away to live in a cottage where she began writing. "Psycho" was the final song to be finished from the album.

The announcement of the album came alongside the news that Peters had signed to Ed Sheeran's label Gingerbread Man Records on 15 June 2021. In a statement, Peters said that “Signing to Gingerbread is a dream come true” after she "grew up inspired and in awe of Ed".

Singles and promotion
"John Hughes Movie" was released as the lead single on 26 February 2021. Peters said that she took inspiration for the track from the John Hughes films that "encapsulate that foolish romantic energy of high school and everything that I, a small town English wannabe Molly Ringwald wanted to be, but was not". Peters cited Pretty in Pink and Sixteen Candles as the primary Hughes films from which she took inspiration.
 
The second single "Psycho" was released on 2 July 2021. "Psycho" is one of three songs that Peters co-wrote with Sheeran.

On 11 August 2021, "You Signed Up for This" and "Brooklyn" were released as a double A-side single.

Critical reception

At Metacritic, which assigns a normalized rating out of 100 to reviews from professional publications, You Signed Up for This received an average score of 84 based on 6 reviews, indicating "universal acclaim". Aggregator AnyDecentMusic? gave it 6.9 out of 10, based on their assessment of the critical consensus.

Track listing

Notes
 "Elvis Song" contains elements from "Always on My Mind", written by Wayne Thompson, Mark James, Johnny Christopher, which was covered by Elvis Presley in 1972.
  indicates a main and vocal producer
  signifies an additional producer
  indicates a co-producer

Personnel
Musicians
 Maisie Peters – vocals
 Henrik Michaelsen – guitar, bass, drums, backup vocals
 Andrew Haas – guitar, bass, drums, synthesiser, backup vocals
 Ian Franzino – drums

Production
 Stuart Hawkes – mastering engineer
 Mark Stent – mixing engineer
 Henrik Michaelsen – engineer
 Ian Franzino – engineer

Charts

Release history

References

 
2021 debut albums
Maisie Peters albums
Albums produced by Fred Again
Gingerbread Man Records albums